Spurfowl are two genera of birds:

 Galloperdix, from India and Sri Lanka
 Pternistis, from Africa

Birds by common name